Energy Efficiency Services Limited (EESL) is the organisation responsible for implementation of Domestic Efficient Lighting Programme (DELP) or the UJALA scheme, as it is now being referred to.

About
Energy Efficiency Services Limited (EESL) is a joint venture of state-run power companies, responsible for implementation of Domestic Efficient Lighting Programme (DELP). It has reduced the prices of LED bulbs by 75%.

References

External links
 
 Energy Efficiency Services Limited (EESL) Official Website

Energy conservation in India
 Government-owned companies of India
 Indian companies established in 2009